Gadair European Airlines was an airline based in Madrid, Spain. It was operating aircraft on ACMI leases for services to five continents. A number of changes of plan have been made, including a switch to Bahrain as the main hub.

History

The airline planned to launch operations on 10 April 2006 but was delayed due to licensing acquirement issues and began operations in June 2007. The airline was owned by Grupo AISA and Santiago Sanchez Marin.

In 2007 new shareholders entered in a capital increase, that resulted having two new shareholders, S. Kahla 25% and A. Baker 50%. The airline ceased operations around 2009.

Fleet
2 Boeing 757 on lease

See also
List of defunct airlines of Spain

References

External links

Airline History - Spain

Defunct airlines of Spain
Airlines established in 2006
Airlines disestablished in 2009